Pitoëff is a surname transliterated in French from the Armenian-language surname Питоев (Pitoyev).

The surname may refer to:

Georges Pitoëff (1884-1939), Russian and French (Russian-born of Armenian origins) actor and theater director
Sacha Pitoëff (1920-1990), French film actor and theater director, son of Georges
Ludmilla Pitoëff (1895-1951), French actress, wife of Georges

References

Armenian-language surnames
French-language surnames